Polad Bulbuloghlu (born February 4, 1945) is a Soviet and Azerbaijani singer, actor, politician, and diplomat. Bulbuloghlu became famous in the Soviet Union with composing jazz-influenced pop songs which has heavy Azerbaijani folk feelings in Azerbaijani and Russian languages. He also sang his own songs. Three of his songs became Songs of the Year and he received numerous prestigious awards in the Soviet Union. Bulbuloghlu is a lyrical tenor.

In the late 1990s, despite having a huge success with a new version arranged by Paul Buckmaster of his old song Gəl Ey Səhər (Come, Hey Morning!) in Turkey and sold-out concerts in Russia, Bulbuloghlu started a political career. He became the Minister of Culture of Azerbaijan and is currently the Azerbaijani ambassador to Russia.

In 2017, he was a candidate to the post of Director-General of UNESCO. He withdrew his candidacy on October 10 after getting only 2 votes in the first round of the election.

Biography
Bulbuloghlu was born Polad Murtuza oghlu Mammadov on February 4, 1945, in Baku, Azerbaijan SSR. His father was Murtuza Rza oglu Mammadov (1897–1961), better known by sobriquet Bulbul (lit. "nightingale"), a famous Azerbaijani opera singer and a native of Shusha, who exposed Polad to musical culture from an early age. His Batumi-born mother Adelaida Mammadova (née Gasimova, 1922–2015), who was the director of the Bulbul Museum until her death, was the daughter of Rza Gasimov, son of an Azerbaijani merchant from Yerevan, and his wife Ketevan who belonged to the Georgian noble Vezirishvili family. Polad studied the piano in a music school and then studied composing in the Baku Academy of Music, under Gara Garayev. By the age of 17 he composed several songs that were performed by professionals, as well as songs for his friend Muslim Magomayev. Bülbüloğlu's singing talent was also discovered on a trip to Moscow with Magomayev, where Bulbuloghlu recorded his own songs in the Azerbaijani language.

In his career, Bulbuloghlu combined modern music style with national Azerbaijani music to create a new musical stream in the Soviet Union. He toured the entire USSR and performed around the world. In 1982, Bülbüloğlu became a National Artist of the Azerbaijan SSR. He participated in the Soviet television program and festival Song of the Year and won the first prize on four occasions. His songs were performed, among others, by Muslim Magomayev, Joseph Kobzon and Lev Leshchenko.

In 1969, Bulbuloghlu became a member of the USSR Union of Composers and the USSR Union of Cinematographers. He composed music for over twenty feature films and had leading roles in several. Among others, he worked with the Russian director Eduard Smolny. Bulbuloghlu has a star at the Moscow Performers' Square, inaugurated in 2000. He received a doctorate of the History of Art from the Azerbaijan National Academy of Culture and holds an honorary professorship in the Azerbaijan State University of Culture and Arts.

Polad's son, Teimur Polad oghlu Bulbul, born in 1975, is a musician in the Tchaikovsky Symphony Orchestra of Moscow Radio and a Meritorious Artist of the Russian Federation.

Public career
Bulbuloghlu managed the Stage Ensemble of the Azerbaijan SSR (from 1976) and the Azerbaijan National Philharmonic Orchestra for several years (from 1987), and in 1988 became the Culture Minister of the Azerbaijan SSR. In 1995 he joined the National Assembly of Azerbaijan. In 2006, Polad left the post of Minister of Culture and moved to Moscow, where he was appointed Ambassador of the Republic of Azerbaijan to the Russian Federation. In 2017 Polad Bülbüloğlu ran for head of UNESCO, but dropped out of the race.

Awards
 – National Award of Peace and Progress (2010) – for special contribution to peace and friendship and resolution of cultural problems in the Turkish-speaking world
 International Order of the Patrons of the Century (2006) – for extraordinary achievements in diplomacy
 – Order of Friendship (2005) – for development of cultural ties between Russia and Azerbaijan
 – Order of Independence (2005) – for development of Azeri culture
 – Order of Honour (2002)
 Song of the Year (1980 – Tell Your Eyes, 1979 – Beloved Country, 1978 – I am in Love, 1977 – Will Be Delighted by the Sun Again)
 – For service to the Fatherland Order (2nd class)
 – Heydar Aliyev Order (2020)

Titles
 People's Artist of Turkmenistan (2017)
 Om emerit al Republicii Moldova (2005)
 People's Artist of the Azerbaijan SSR

Filmography

Songs 
Şən Azərbaycan (1970)
Gəl Ey Səhər (Come, Hey Morning!)

References

External links 
 Polad Bulbuloghlu's biography, made by the UN.
 

1945 births
Living people
Ambassadors of Azerbaijan to Russia
20th-century Azerbaijani male actors
Azerbaijani male film actors
Diplomats from Baku
Politicians from Baku
20th-century Azerbaijani male singers
Azerbaijani composers
Azerbaijani people of Georgian descent
Musicians from Baku
Members of the National Assembly (Azerbaijan)
Recipients of the Istiglal Order
People's Artists of Azerbaijan
Baku Academy of Music alumni
Soviet Azerbaijani people
Folk-pop singers
Honored Art Workers of the Azerbaijan SSR